"Ac-Cent-Tchu-Ate the Positive" is a popular song which was published in 1944. The music was written by Harold Arlen and the lyrics by Johnny Mercer. The song was nominated for the "Academy Award for Best Original Song" at the 18th Academy Awards in 1945 after being used in the film Here Come the Waves.

Background
It is sung in the style of a sermon, and explains that accentuating the positive is key to happiness. In describing his inspiration for the lyric, Mercer told the Pop Chronicles radio documentary "[my] publicity agent ... went to hear Father Divine and he had a sermon and his subject was 'you got to accentuate the positive and eliminate the negative.'  And I said 'Wow, that's a colorful phrase!'"

Chart performance
Mercer recorded the song, with The Pied Pipers and Paul Weston's orchestra, on October 4, 1944, and it was released by Capitol Records as catalog number 180. The record first reached the Billboard magazine charts on January 4, 1945, and lasted 13 weeks on the chart, peaking at number 2.  On the Harlem Hit Parade chart, it went to number four.
The song was number five on Billboard's Annual High School Survey in 1945.

On March 25, 2015, it was announced that Mercer's version would be inducted into the Library of Congress's National Recording Registry for the song's "cultural, artistic and/or historical significance to American society and the nation’s audio legacy".

Other recordings

Within a matter of weeks, several other recordings of the song were released by other well-known artists:

Bing Crosby and The Andrews Sisters made a recording on December 8, 1944, with Vic Schoen and his Orchestra, which was released by Decca Records as catalog number 23379. The record first reached the Billboard magazine charts on January 25, 1945, and lasted nine weeks on the chart, peaking at number 2.
 Kay Kyser made a recording on December 21, 1944, with Dolly Mitchell and a vocal trio. This was released by Columbia as catalog number 36771.
 Dinah Washington recorded the song with Lionel Hampton on live broadcast on March 8, 1945.
 A recording by Artie Shaw was released by RCA Victor Records as catalog number 20-1612. The record first reached the Billboard magazine charts on January 25, 1945, and lasted five weeks on the chart, peaking at  number 5.

A few months later, another version was recorded by Johnny Green in the United Kingdom on April 6, 1945, and released by Parlophone Records as catalog number F-2069.

Connie Francis added the song in 1960 to her "Swinging Medley" (sometimes also referred to as "Gospel Medley"), where she combined it with three other songs: "Yes, indeed", "Amen", and "Lonesome Road". Three versions of this medley were recorded on different occasions in 1960. The first recording was broadcast in a mock-live radio show of National Guard Radio early that year. The two other recordings were intended for release on Francis's label MGM Records but remained unreleased until 1996 on Bear Family Records.

The song was included by Roy Hamilton on his 1960 album Come Out Swingin. Ella Fitzgerald included the song on her 1961 double album "Ella Fitzgerald Sings the Harold Arlen Songbook" on Verve Records.

The song has twice been recorded by Perry Como: once on February 19, 1958, and later in July, 1980. Both were primarily made for albums. Neither version was released as a single in the United States, though the 1958 version was released in Germany by RCA as a single (catalog number 47-9243-A).

Aretha Franklin recorded it for the 1962 album The Electrifying Aretha Franklin for Columbia Records, and it features in her many re-releases on that label.

Sam Cooke recorded it for his Encore album in 1958.

Dave Van Ronk covered this song on his 1971 album, Van Ronk.

A cover of the song was included by Susannah McCorkle on her 1993 album From Bessie to Brazil.

The American rock band NRBQ made another version of this song.

The Vindictives, a Chicago punk band, released a version on their 1999 album Hypno-Punko.

John Boutte of New Orleans also released a version of this song.

Kelly Hogan sings a version on Jon Rauhouse's Steel Guitar Air Show (2002).

Al Jarreau released a version of this song on his 2004 album Accentuate the Positive.

The song has been used for many years as the theme for the Christian children's television program Faithville, in a version by the Spitfire Band.

Cliff Richard recorded this song on his 2010 album Bold as Brass.

Billy Gorilly released a recording of the song as a single in January 2012. This version was used as the soundtrack for the animated children's cartoon music video released in October 2012.

Paul McCartney covered it on his 2012 album Kisses on the Bottom.

Jools Holland covered this on his 2012 album The Golden Age Of Song with Rumer on vocals.

Barry Manilow covered the song on his 2014 studio album Night Songs.

The British swing girl group The Puppini Sisters recorded and covered the song for their 5th studio album, The High Life.

A version by Peggy Lee recorded in the early 1950s on a radio program she hosted was released on the 2021 album Something Wonderful: Peggy Lee Sings the Great American Songbook.

In popular culture

 The song was written for Here Come the Waves (1944), starring Bing Crosby and Betty Hutton and directed by Mark Sandrich.
 Dean Martin and Leslie Uggams performed the song on The Dean Martin Show, episode 0718, originally aired January 12, 1967.
 The Bing Crosby/Andrews Sisters recording of the song appears in the 1986 BBC serial The Singing Detective.
 The song was used in the 1991 film Bugsy.
 The song was used in Coronation Street in 2010 as one of the songs played at Blanche Hunt's funeral.
 The song featured in the BBC TV Series Casualty on the 9th October 2010, involving Lenny Lyons and a patient with a brain tumour, who could hear the song in her head when she was about to have a seizure.
 The American cable television network The Family Channel (now Freeform) used a reworked version of this song as part of its on-air imaging in the early 1990s, to emphasize the station's "positive," family-friendly image.
 The song was covered by Dr. John in his 1989 album In a Sentimental Mood and used in the 1992 movie The Mighty Ducks.
 The original Johnny Mercer recording of the song features in the 1997 American police drama L.A. Confidential
 The song appears in the final episode of time-travel television series Quantum Leap.
 It is also part of the soundtrack for Midnight in the Garden of Good and Evil, where it is covered by Clint Eastwood.
 The Perry Como version was featured in the 1999 film Blast from the Past.
 As sung by Jack Sheldon, it was also the theme song for the U.S. TV series Homefront.
 It was also used in commercials for Australian health insurance provider HBF in the early 2000s, and UK gas and electricity provider npower in 2008.
 In April 2011, the first episode of the second season of Treme was called Accentuate the Positive, with several performances of this song.
 Stephen Colbert sang the song with Julie Andrews on the April 24, 2012, episode of The Colbert Report.
 The Bing Crosby & Andrews Sisters version features in the 1995 crime thriller Things to Do in Denver When You're Dead.
 Bethesda Softworks' 2015 video game, Fallout 4, features a clip of the song from a 1945 broadcast of Bing Crosby's Kraft Music Hall with John Scott Trotter and his orchestra.
 The last episode of the World War 2 sitcom Goodnight Sweetheart was titled "Accentuate the Positive" in a reference to this song.
 In 2019, the Aretha Franklin version was heard on the Citi Rewards+ commercial.
 In 2020, Cate Blanchett sings the song as the character "Pat" for the Australian TV Drama, Stateless.
 In 2020, the Bing Crosby/Andrews Sisters recording of the song appears in an episode of the fourth season of the FX black comedy crime drama Fargo
 In 2021 The Bing Crosby/Andrews Sisters recording of the song appears in the Paul Thomas Anderson movie Licorice Pizza.
 In 2023, the song was briefly featured in the horror film M3GAN.

See also
Posi music

References

1944 songs
1944 singles
Perry Como songs
Vikki Carr songs
Songs with music by Harold Arlen
Pop standards
Grammy Hall of Fame Award recipients
Songs with lyrics by Johnny Mercer
Paul McCartney songs
United States National Recording Registry recordings
Al Jarreau songs
Capitol Records singles
Johnny Mercer songs